Savković is a village in Serbia. It is situated in the Ljubovija municipality, in the Mačva District of Central Serbia. The village had a Serb ethnic majority and a population of 321 in 2002.

Historical population

1948: 675
1953: 721
1961: 692
1971: 566
1981: 460
1991: 350
2002: 321

References

See also
List of places in Serbia

Populated places in Mačva District
Ljubovija